The Hôtel d'Aubière is a historic hôtel particulier in Clermont-Ferrand, France. It was built in the 15th century, with extensions in the 18th century. It has been listed as an official historical monument since September 1, 1967.

References

Hôtels particuliers in Clermont-Ferrand
Houses completed in the 15th century